Björkviken is a locality situated in Borgholm Municipality, Kalmar County, Sweden with 208 inhabitants in 2010. Supposedly, at 11.01 hectares, it is the smallest town in Sweden.

References 

Populated places in Borgholm Municipality